In the mathematical areas of order and lattice theory, the Knaster–Tarski theorem, named after Bronisław Knaster and Alfred Tarski, states the following:

Let (L, ≤) be a complete lattice and let f : L → L be an monotonic function (w.r.t. ≤&hairsp;). Then the set of fixed points of f in L also forms a complete lattice under ≤&hairsp;.

It was Tarski who stated the result in its most general form, and so the theorem is often known as Tarski's fixed-point theorem. Some time earlier, Knaster and Tarski established the result for the special case where L is the lattice of subsets of a set, the power set lattice.

The theorem has important applications in formal semantics of programming languages and abstract interpretation.

A kind of converse of this theorem was proved by Anne C. Davis: If every order preserving function f : L → L on a lattice L has a fixed point, then L is a complete lattice.

Consequences: least and greatest fixed points
Since complete lattices cannot be empty (they must contain a supremum and infimum of the empty set), the theorem in particular guarantees the existence of at least one fixed point of f, and even the existence of a least fixed point (or greatest fixed point). In many practical cases, this is the most important implication of the theorem.

The least fixpoint of f is the least element x such that f(x) = x, or, equivalently, such that f(x) ≤ x; the dual holds for the greatest fixpoint, the greatest element x such that f(x) = x.

If f(lim xn) = lim f(xn) for all ascending sequences xn, then the least fixpoint of f is lim f n(0) where 0 is the least element of L, thus giving a more "constructive" version of the theorem. (See: Kleene fixed-point theorem.) More generally, if f is monotonic, then the least fixpoint of f is the stationary limit of f α(0), taking α over the ordinals, where f α is defined by transfinite induction: f α+1 = f (f α) and f γ for a limit ordinal γ is the least upper bound of the f β for all β ordinals less than γ. The dual theorem holds for the greatest fixpoint.

For example, in theoretical computer science, least fixed points of monotonic functions are used to define program semantics. Often a more specialized version of the theorem is used, where L is assumed to be the lattice of all subsets of a certain set ordered by subset inclusion. This reflects the fact that in many applications only such lattices are considered. One then usually is looking for the smallest set that has the property of being a fixed point of the function f. Abstract interpretation makes ample use of the Knaster–Tarski theorem and the formulas giving the least and greatest fixpoints.

The Knaster–Tarski theorem can be used to give a simple proof of the Cantor–Bernstein–Schroeder theorem.

Weaker versions of the theorem
Weaker versions of the Knaster–Tarski theorem can be formulated for ordered sets, but involve more complicated assumptions. For example:

Let L be a partially ordered set with a least element (bottom) and let f : L → L be an monotonic function. Further, suppose there exists u in L such that f(u) ≤ u and that any chain in the subset  has a supremum. Then f admits a least fixed point.

This can be applied to obtain various theorems on invariant sets, e.g. the Ok's theorem:

For the monotone map F : P(X&hairsp;) → P(X&hairsp;) on the family of (closed) nonempty subsets of X, the following are equivalent: (o) F admits A in P(X&hairsp;) s.t. , (i) F admits invariant set A in P(X&hairsp;) i.e. , (ii) F admits maximal invariant set A, (iii) F admits the greatest invariant set A.

In particular, using the Knaster-Tarski principle one can develop the theory of global attractors for noncontractive discontinuous (multivalued) iterated function systems. For weakly contractive iterated function systems the Kantorovitch fixpoint theorem (known also as Tarski-Kantorovitch fixpoint principle) suffices.

Other applications of fixed-point principles for ordered sets come from the theory of differential, integral and operator equations.

Proof
Let us restate the theorem.

For a complete lattice  and a monotone function  on L, the set of all fixpoints of f is also a complete lattice , with:
  as the greatest fixpoint of f
  as the least fixpoint of f.

Proof. We begin by showing that P has both a least element and a greatest element. Let D = {x | x ≤ f(x)} and x ∈ D (we know that at least 0L belongs to D). Then because f is monotone we have f(x) ≤ f(f(x)), that is f(x) ∈ D.

Now let  (u exists because D ⊆ L and L is a complete lattice). Then for all x ∈ D it is true that x ≤ u and f(x) ≤ f(u), so x ≤ f(x) ≤ f(u). Therefore, f(u) is an upper bound of D, but u is the least upper bound, so u ≤ f(u), i.e. u ∈ D. Then f(u) ∈ D (because f(u) ≤ f(f(u))) and so f(u) ≤ u from which follows f(u) = u. Because every fixpoint is in D we have that u is the greatest fixpoint of f.

The function f is monotone on the dual (complete) lattice . As we have just proved, its greatest fixpoint exists. It is the least fixpoint of L, so P has least and greatest elements, that is more generally, every monotone function on a complete lattice has a least fixpoint and a greatest fixpoint.

For a, b in L we write [a, b] for the closed interval with bounds a and b: {x ∈ L | a ≤ x ≤ b}. If a ≤ b, then [a, b], ≤ is a complete lattice.

It remains to be proven that P is a complete lattice. We show that f([w, 1L]) ⊆ [w, 1L]. Indeed, for every x ∈ W we have x = f(x) and since w is the least upper bound of W, x ≤ f(w). In particular w ≤ f(w). Then from y ∈ [w, 1L] follows that w ≤ f(w) ≤ f(y), giving f(y) ∈ [w, 1L] or simply f([w, 1L]) ⊆ [w, 1L]. This allows us to look at f as a function on the complete lattice [w, 1L]. Then it has a least fixpoint there, giving us the least upper bound of W. We've shown that an arbitrary subset of P has a supremum, that is, P is a complete lattice.

See also
 Modal μ-calculus

Notes

References

Further reading

External links
 J. B. Nation, Notes on lattice theory.
An application to an elementary combinatorics problem: Given a book with 100 pages and 100 lemmas, prove that there is some lemma written on the same page as its index

Order theory
Fixed points (mathematics)
Fixed-point theorems
Theorems in the foundations of mathematics
Articles containing proofs